Acquire Business Process Outsourcing (formerly Acquire Asia Pacific) is a global business process outsourcing firm that specializes in back office support, customer acquisition, customer service, technical support, lead generation and software development.

History

Formation 
Registered initially as Acquire Asia Pacific, the business was founded by two entrepreneurs with a background in contact centre outsourcing, Max Tennant and Jonathan (Jono) Smith. Jono had been living in the Philippines for several years, setting up contact centres for US companies. Together they identified the opportunity for Australian companies to operate from the Philippines, a new concept in the Australian market.

Acquire was initially focused on providing consulting services to Australian companies to help them navigate the complexities of outsourcing to the Philippines and provide knowledgeable consultants on the ground to ensure that work was delivered to a high standard. Acquire’s first customer was APPT, an Australian Telco, followed by several other brands like Ingram Micro, AEGON Insurance, St George and Dodo, a budget ISP.

In September 2006 Max and Jono partnered with Larry Kestelman, the owner of Dodo to provide full-service outsourcing initially to Dodo, with a plan to expand to other customers after. Max and Jono later sold their interests in Acquire 25 October 2007, but are recognised by the industry as setting the foundation of what the company is today.

Expansion 
In 2013 the company moved their headquarters to Melbourne, Australia.

Acquire BPO opened a new site in Dallas, Texas in the United States in 2015. The following year, it formally inaugurated its newest delivery center in the Dominican Republic.

With its July 2020 acquisition of The Smart Group Australia, it now offers onshore, offshore and Work from Home.

Products and services 
From offering contact centre and back office services, including data entry, HR administration, payment processing, accounting and bookkeeping, Acquire has expanded to establish an Automation and Intelligence line of business, Acquire.AI, specializing in Robotic Process Automation (RPA), chatbots, voice biometrics and speech analytics.

References 

Service companies of Australia
Companies established in 2005
Outsourcing companies